Dana Criswell (born October 9, 1963) is an American politician who has served in the Mississippi House of Representatives from the 6th district since 2016.

References

1963 births
Living people
Republican Party members of the Mississippi House of Representatives
21st-century American politicians